In computing, a visual programming language (visual programming system, VPL, or, VPS) or block coding is a programming language that lets users create programs by manipulating program elements graphically rather than by specifying them textually. A VPL allows programming with visual expressions, spatial arrangements of text and graphic symbols, used either as elements of syntax or secondary notation. For example, many VPLs (known as diagrammatic programming) are based on the idea of "boxes and arrows", where boxes or other screen objects are treated as entities, connected by arrows, lines or arcs which represent relations.

Definition
VPLs may be further classified, according to the type and extent of visual expression used, into icon-based languages, form-based languages, and diagram languages. Visual programming environments provide graphical or iconic elements which can be manipulated by users in an interactive way according to some specific spatial grammar for program construction.

The general goal of VPLs is to make programming more accessible to novices and to support programmers at three different levels

 Syntax: VPLs use icons/blocks, forms and diagrams trying to reduce or even eliminate the potential of syntactic errors helping with the arrangement of programming primitives to create well-formed programs. 
 Semantics: VPLs may provide some mechanisms to disclose the meaning of programming primitives. This could include help functions providing documentation functions built-in to programming languages. 
 Pragmatics: VPLs support the study of what programs mean in particular situations. This level of support allows users to put artifacts created with a VPL into a certain state in order to explore how the program will react to that state. Examples: In AgentSheets or AgentCubes users can set games or simulations into a particular state in order to see how program would react. With the Thymio programming language users can bring a robot into a certain state in order to see how it will react, i.e., which sensors will be activated.

Current developments try to integrate the visual programming approach with dataflow programming languages to either have immediate access to the program state, resulting in online debugging, or automatic program generation and documentation. Dataflow languages also allow automatic parallelization, which is likely to become one of the greatest programming challenges of the future.

The Visual Basic, Visual C#, Visual J# etc. languages of the Microsoft Visual Studio IDE are not visual programming languages: the representation of algorithms etc. is textual even though the IDE embellishes the editing and debugging activities with a rich user interface. A similar consideration applies to most other rapid application development environments which typically support a form designer and sometimes also have graphical tools to illustrate (but not define) control flow and data dependencies.

Parsers for visual programming languages can be implemented using graph grammars.

List of visual languages 

The following contains a list of notable visual programming languages.

Educational 

 AgentCubes, 3D and 2D game design and simulation design computational thinking tools.
 AgentSheets, game authoring and computational science authoring tool.
 Alice, an object based language used to program 3D environments.
 Analytica, for building and analyzing quantitative models for decision and risk analysis.
 App Inventor for Android, a tool for creating Android applications, based on Blockly and Kawa.
 Blockly, a client-side library for the programming language JavaScript for creating block-based visual programming languages (VPLs) and editors
 Bubble, for creating production-ready web applications.
Catrobat, block-based visual programming language for animations, apps and games
 Flowcode, a visual programming tool for embedded microcontrollers and Windows.
 Flowgorithm, creates executable flowcharts which can be converted to several languages.
 Hopscotch, an iPad app, and visual programming language for creating touchscreen-oriented mobile applications. 
 Kodu, a visual programming tool for Logo.
 Kojo, a programming language, IDE, and learning environment.
 mBlock, an extension of Scratch for Arduino hardware interfaces. Developed by Makeblock.
 Open Roberta, online programming environment from Fraunhofer IAIS, designed for children.
 Pencil Code, a visual programming language centered on drawing with a pencil
 Raptor, a product of the USAF, for drawing executable flowcharts.
 Scratch, a product of MIT, designed for children in K-12 and after-school programs.
 ScratchJr, an interpretation of Scratch designed primarily for younger audiences (5-7-year-old children).
 Snap!, a browser-based reimplementation of BYOB, and extension of Scratch, with first class procedures and lists. Used for teaching at UC Berkeley.
 Stagecast Creator, a Java-based teaching system.
 StarLogo, an agent-based simulation language developed by Mitchel Resnick, Eric Klopfer, and others at MIT Media Lab. An extension of the Logo programming language (a dialect of Lisp).
 ToonTalk, programming system for children.
Visual Logic, for creating executable flowcharts.
 VIPLE Visual IoT/Robotics Programming Language Environment

Multimedia 
 AudioMulch, an audio signal flow based sound and music creation environment
 Bidule, a modular node and patch cord environment for the creation of interactive computer music and multimedia (Windows, MacOS).
 Blender (software), the open source 3D graphics package, includes node graphs for building shaders, composites and textures, non-destructive geometry.
 Cameleon, graphical functional language
 Clickteam's The games factory/Multimedia fusion series, environments made for visually developing games
 Dynamo, a generative modeling interface for Autodesk Revit
 Filter Forge Node based filter generation for image processing.
 Houdini (software) vfx, modeling and animation software.
 GenerativeComponents, a parametric CAD software developed by Bentley Systems
 Grasshopper 3d, a generative modeling interface for Rhinoceros 3D
 Isadora, a proprietary graphic programming environment for Mac OS X and Microsoft Windows, with emphasis on real-time manipulation of digital video.
 Kyma (sound design language), a visual programming language for sound design used by musicians, researchers, and sound designers.
 Mama (software) – a programming language and IDE for building 3D animations and games
 Max (software), visual programming environment for building interactive, real-time music and multimedia applications
 Max/MSP
 Pure Data
 nato.0+55+3d
 Nodal, a node-based generative programming software application for music composition
 Nuke, an object-based visual programming software for visual effects compositing by The Foundry powered by Tcl, Python and Blink-script.
 OpenMusic, a visual programming language for music composition (based on Common Lisp Object System (CLOS)) applications, and mobile applications
 Pure Data (Pd) is a visual programming language developed for creating interactive computer music and multimedia works.
 Quartz Composer, a language for processing and rendering graphical data
 Reaktor, a DSP and MIDI-processing language by Native Instruments
 Scala Multimedia Authoring suite and complete multimedia system for AmigaOS and Windows
 Softimage, with ICE Interactive Creative Environment.
 SynthEdit, a Synthesizer construction tool using a VPL.
 TouchDesigner, visual programming language for real-time multimedia content
 Virtools, a middleware used to create interactive 3D experiences
 vvvv,  a general purpose toolkit with a special focus on real-time video synthesis and programming large media environments with physical interfaces, real-time motion graphics, audio and video.
 WireFusion, visual programming environment for creating interactive 3D web presentations

Video games 
 Babylon.js has a node material editor that can be used to build shaders, procedural textures, particle systems and post processing effects.
 Blender Game Engine (Graphical logic editor)
 Clickteam Fusion, a 2D game creation software with event editor system, developed by Clickteam SARL, originally known as Klik n' Play, The Games Factory and Multimedia Fusion 2
 Construct 2-3 are HTML5-based 2D game editors, developed by Scirra Ltd.
 Construct Classic is the previous, DirectX-based open-sourced version of Construct.
 CryEngine has a node-based visual programming language called FlowGraph.
 Dreams, which runs on PlayStation, has an extensive visual language to allow players to create any kind of game
 Game Builder Garage, a 3D and 2D game creation tool for the Nintendo Switch, developed by Nintendo.
 GameMaker Studio, has a drag and drop game creation system developed by YoYo Games.
 GameSalad is a visual game creation tool developed by GameSalad, Inc.
 GDevelop is a visual game creation tool created by Florian Rival (4ian).
 Godot game engine allows game scripts and graphics shaders to be built using node-graph visual programming languages.
 Human Resource Machine is a visual programming-based puzzle game developed by Tomorrow Corporation.
 Kodu, a software designed to program games with a 3D Interface developed by Microsoft Research.
 MakeCode Arcade, by Microsoft
 Pixel Game Maker MV is an interface-based 2D video game development tool.
 Rec Room includes a game creation system with a node-based visual programming language called Circuits.
 Snowdrop has a visual scripting system.
 Stencyl, a video game creation tool.
 Unity has a visual scripting system as of the ECS release.
 Unreal Engine 4 has a node-based visual programming language called Blueprints, and also shaders.

Many modern video games make use of behavior trees, which are in principle a family of simple programming languages designed to model behaviors for non-player characters. The behaviors are modeled as trees, and are often edited in graphical editors.

Systems / simulation 
 Analytica, a commercial visual language for decision models based on influence diagrams.
BPEL (Business Process Execution Language), currently a Graphical user based Programming Language used to create orchestration logic for data and web services. It is based on XML, but has a graphical interface for faster coding.
 DRAKON, a graphical algorithmic language
 EICASLAB, a software suite including a graphical language for supporting the design of control architectures
 Flowcode is a graphical programming language to program embedded microprocessors
 Function block diagrams, used in programmable logic controllers
 GNU Radio, a development toolkit which provides signal-processing blocks to implement software-defined-radios and signal-processing systems
 KNIME, the Konstanz Information Miner, is an open source data analytics, reporting and integration platform
 LabVIEW, a graphical language designed for engineers and scientists
 Ladder logic, a language that simulates relay logic commonly used in programmable logic controllers
 MeVisLab, cross-platform application framework for medical image processing and scientific visualization
 Microsoft Visual Programming Language, dataflow language for robotics programming that is a component of Microsoft Robotics Studio
 MindRover, a robot programming game incorporating a dataflow "wiring" language
 Minibloq, visual programming language for robotics and Arduino compatible boards
 MST Workshop, an interactive visual programming language for creating mathematical solutions, rapid prototyping, two-dimensional and three-dimensional graphic applications
 Node-RED: software system rapid development toolkit
 NXT-G, a visual programming language for the Lego Mindstorms NXT robotics kit
 OpenDX scientific data visualization using a visual programming language and data flow model
 OpenWire - adds visual dataflow programming abilities to Delphi via Visual Component Library (VCL) components and a graphical editor (homonymous binary protocol is unrelated)
 Orange - An open-source, visual programming tool for data mining, statistical data analysis, and machine learning
 OutSystems language, a visual modeling language to develop and change all layers of business centric web applications 
 Prograph - an object-oriented programming language that uses iconic symbols to represent actions to be taken on data
Ptolemy Project - a project aimed at modeling and designing real-time embedded systems.
 Qucs graphical interface to set up simulation of electronic circuit signal and noise behavior
 Reallusion - iClone, a 3D software with Lua language and visual programming design
 ROBO Pro, a visual programming language for the fischertechnik robotics kit
 Scicos A graphical language associated with the numerical analysis package ScicosLab (originally SciLab)
 Sequential function chart, a Petri-net like programming language for programmable logic controllers
 Simcenter Amesim, graphical programming environment for modeling, simulating and analyzing multidomain dynamical systems
 Simulink, graphical programming environment for modeling, simulating and analyzing multidomain dynamical systems
 Stateflow, a graphical language that includes  executable state transition diagrams, flow charts, state transition tables, and truth tables
 STELLA, a VPL for system dynamics modeling
 Softimage ICE, a node-based system that is used to create and modify 3D models, simulate particles and perform various other tasks
 VEE is a powerful graphical programming environment for automated test, measurement and advanced analysis used in Test Engineering.
 VisSim, modeling and simulation language, allows making mathematical models quickly and executing them in real-time

Automation 
 Automator
 CiMPLE, Visual Programming Language by ThinkLABs for teaching robotics
 Flow a graphical integration language used in the webMethods platform
 Pipeline Pilot is a scientific visual and dataflow programming language, and the authoring tool for the Accelrys Enterprise Platform.

Data warehousing / business intelligence 
 Ab Initio, a tool for ETL processing by creating graphs
 Alteryx Designer, a tool for data processing and analytics incorporating SQL, R, and Python.
 Apache Nifi, software project to automate the flow of data between software systems.
 IBM Cognos Business Intelligence, is an example for front-end programs in Business Intelligence applications, which are used to generate SQL queries to run against RDBMS databases
 IBM InfoSphere DataStage, an ETL tool
 Informatica Powercenter is an ETL tool to design mappings graphically for data load in Data Warehouse systems
 Microsoft SQL Server Integration Services (SSIS), a platform for data integration and workflow applications
 Pentaho Data Integration (PDI), formerly named Kettle, an open-source ETL tool

Miscellaneous 
 Kwikpoint, an isotype visual translator created by Alan Stillman
 Lava, an experimental object oriented RAD language
 Morphic (software), makes it easier to build and edit graphical objects by direct manipulation and from within programs; the whole Self (programming language) programming environment is built using Morphic
Piet, an esoteric language, the program is an image whose pixels are the language's elements
PWCT, Free open source visual programming language for software development
 Shortcuts, a visual scripting language developed by Apple for creating macros on macOS, iOS, iPadOS, and watchOS.
 StreamBase Systems, StreamBase EventFlow is a visual programming language for processing streaming events
 WebML, is a visual language for designing complex data-intensive Web applications that can be automatically generated
 Yahoo! Pipes is a visual data-flow programming system to process web data
 YAWL, graphical workflow language

Legacy 
 AppWare, also known as MicroBrew, icon based programming for classic Mac OS and Microsoft Windows
 Macromedia Authorware - flowchart based programming language
 Helix and Double Helix, a pioneering database management system for the Apple Macintosh platform, created in 1983
 Illumination Software Creator, a language and IDE for visually creating desktop and mobile software
 ThingLab

Visual styles 
 DRAKON (Dragon), a SDL- and AADL-influenced visual 2D programming language designed for developing the on-board hard real-time software system for automatic flight and landing of the Soviet/Russian Buran (Snowstorm) orbiting spacecraft
 Executable UML, a profile of the Universal Modeling Language specification defining executable semantics for a subset of UML
 Flowchart
 Subtext

See also
Argument map
Cognitive dimensions of notations - Notation assessment for visual and non-visual languages
Concept map
Dataflow programming
Deutsch limit, an aphorism about the information density of language primitives in a visual notation
Domain-specific modeling
Drag and drop
Flow-based programming
Graph drawing
Low-code development platform
No-code development platform
Programming game
Unified Modeling Language
Visual language
Visual thinking

References

This article was originally based on material from the Free On-line Dictionary of Computing, used with permission. Update as needed.

External links

Programming language classification